BSTS may refer to:
 Bulletin of Science, Technology & Society, a bimonthly peer-reviewed academic journal that publishes papers in the field of science education
 Boost Surveillance and Tracking System (BSTS), a US effort to track missiles during the 1980s and 1990s
 Bayesian structural time series, a statistical technique